The following is a list of indoor arenas in Morocco.

Current

Under Construction

Proposed Arenas

See also
List of indoor arenas in Africa

References

External links
Morocco at WorldStadiums.com.

 

Indoor arenas in Morocco
Indoor arenas
Morocco
Indoor arenas